Black Hispanic and Latino Americans, also called Afro-Hispanics, Afro-Latinos or Black Hispanics, or Black Latinos are classified by the United States Census Bureau, Office of Management and Budget, and other U.S. government agencies as Black people living in the United States with ancestry in Spain or Latin America and/or who speak Spanish, and/or Portuguese as their first language.

Hispanidad, which is independent of race, is the only ethnic category, as opposed to racial category, which is officially collated by the U.S. Census Bureau. The distinction made by government agencies for those within the population of any official race category, including "Black", is between those who report Hispanic backgrounds and all others who do not. Non-Hispanic Blacks consists of an ethnically diverse collection of all others who are classified as Black or African American that do not report Hispanic ethnic backgrounds.

Demographics
New York, Massachusetts, Pennsylvania, New Jersey, Connecticut and Rhode Island have some of the highest percentages of Hispanics identifying as Black, where up to 25% of Hispanics identify as black, compared to 2.5% of Hispanics nationwide. Overall, the Northeast region has the largest concentration of Black Hispanics; this is partly because of the large Puerto Rican, Dominican, and other mostly or partly African descended Hispanic populations in the region.

Black Hispanics accounted for 2.5% of the entire U.S. Hispanic population in 2010. Most Black Hispanics in the United States come from within the Dominican and Puerto Rican populations. Aside from the Dominican Republic and Puerto Rico, large numbers of Black Hispanics can also be found in populations originating from northern South America, and the Caribbean coast of Central America as well, including the Panamanian and Colombian communities, and to a lesser extent, the Cuban-American community.

The number of Black Hispanics increased from 1,700,000 in 2010 to about 2,400,000 in 2019, about 4% of all Hispanics in the US

Because views of race in Latin America and the United States are slightly different, there is a fluidity in identifying with terms such as "black" or "Afro Latino" among Latinos in the United States. Recent immigrants from Latin America are more likely to embrace mixed identities (mestizaje) while thinking less of their African side, and some immigrant Latinos who are full black with little to no admixture do not identify as black. In contrast, Latinos who have lived in the United States for several generations are more likely to adopt urban afrocentric mentalities from African Americans and abandon that of their home countries, embracing the One-drop rule, this is especially true for large portions of the Puerto Rican and now Dominican communities on the eastcoast. 
The main aspects which distinguish Black Hispanics born in the United States of America from African Americans is having Spanish as their mother tongue or most recent ancestors' native language, their culture passed down by their parents, and their Spanish surnames. Of all Hispanic groups, Puerto Ricans have the closest relationship with the African American community, and because of this there is also increasing intermarriages and offspring between non-Hispanic blacks and Hispanics of any race, mainly between Puerto Ricans and African Americans, which increases both the Hispanic ethnic and black racial demographics.

In May 2022, Pew Research Center reported that there were an estimated six million Afro-Latino people in the United States, comprising 2% of the adult U.S. population, and  12% of adult Latinos. They also stated that one-in-seven Afro-Latinos did not "identify as Hispanic" and that 30% of Afro-Latino adults were 18 to 29. The report also stated that Afro-Latinos are more likely to be from Puerto Rico and the Dominican Republic than from Mexico, noting that 40% of people had their families talk about challenges they'd face for their ethnic identity when they grew up, and that the "racial groups Afro-Latinos identify with can be varied and diverse." In the latter case, the report stated that about 30% of Afro-Latinos identified as White, 25% as Black, 23% as "some other race," 16% as "multiple races" and 1% as Asians.

Health 
A review of twenty-one studies found Black Hispanics to have poorer health compared to White Hispanics. The causes are still unknown, but researchers suggested that racial discrimination and segregation may contribute to racial health differences among the Hispanic population in the United States.

Although Black Hispanics are often overlooked or dichotomized as either "black" or "Hispanic" in the United States of America, Black Hispanic writers often reflect upon their racialized experience in their works. The most commonly used term in literature to speak of this ambiguity and multilayered hybridity at the heart of Latino/Latina identity and culture is miscegenation. This "mestizaje" depicts the multi-faceted racial and cultural identity that characterize Black Hispanics and highlights that each individual Black Hispanic has a unique experience within a broader racial and ethnic range. The memoirs, poetry, sociological research, and essays written by Afro-Latino writers reflect this concept of mestizaje in addition to revealing the confusion and uncertainty about one's self-image of being both "Black" and "Hispanic". The psychological and social factors also prove to be central in determining how one ultimately defines him/herself.

Civil rights 
Data from a 2021 survey by the Pew Research Center shows that Hispanic people in the US with darker skin color are more likely to face incidents of discrimination than those with lighter skin. The survey asked participants to self-identify their skin color, and then asked series of questions about the kinds of discrimination they faced. When asked whether they faced at least one instance of discrimination in the last year, 64% of darker-skinned Hispanic adults responded that they had. When asked the same question, 54% of lighter-skinned Hispanic adults responded the same. As for the specific discrimination experienced:

 42% of darker-skinned Hispanic people said they were treated as if they were not smart, compared to 34% of those with lighter skin.
 42% of darker-skinned Hispanic people said they experienced discrimination by someone who is non-Hispanic, compared to 29% of those with lighter skin.
 41% of darker-skinned Hispanic people said they experienced discrimination by someone who is Hispanic, compared to 25% of those with lighter skin.
 33% of darker-skinned Hispanic people were criticized for speaking Spanish, compared to 22% of those with lighter skin.
 32% of darker-skinned Hispanic people were told to go back to their country compared to 20% of those with lighter skin.
 27% of darker-skinned Hispanic people feared for their personal safety, compared to 20% of those with lighter skin.
 31% of darker-skinned Hispanic people were called offensive names, compared to 18% of those with lighter skin.
 16% of darker-skinned Hispanics were unfairly stopped by police, compared to 8% of those with lighter skin.

In Latin America, Black Hispanics have historically had similar discrimination issues as African Americans in the US, including Cuba, where racial discrimination against Afro-Cubans continues to be a major Human Rights issue for the Cuban government, even resulting in riots in Central Havana, a mostly black neighborhood in the capital. In Mexico, racism against black Mexicans has been also an often ignored issue, and it wasn't until 2020 that an option appeared on the national census allowing black Mexicans to self-identify, even though polls had showed that about 1.4 million Mexicans identify as black. Racism in Puerto Rico has also been well-documented, and according to Black Perspectives, "in Puerto Rico, much like in the rest of Latin America, anti-Black racism is embedded in the very denial of its existence by the state and society." Brazil's racism towards its near majority Afro-Brazilian population also has a long, well-documented history, as well as its "whitening ideology" of the 1930s, when the government encouraged European migration to successfully shift the country's racial make-up to a white majority. In Honduras, racism against Afro-Hondurans has also received international attention as the country struggles with discrimination issues. Racism in Argentina, which has a 97 percent white population, is also well-documented and "persists against indigenous peoples, immigrants, Afro-Argentines, mestizo Argentines, Jews and Arabs." Even in countries with majority black Hispanic populations, such as the Dominican Republic, the case of racism against "darker" skinned Dominicans and neighboring Haitians is an issue.

A Pew Research report published in May 2022 surveyed Afro-Latinos. Findings included 61% of Afro-Latinos saying they were discriminated against, including be more likely than other Latinos in being stopped by police, criticized by others for speaking Spanish in a public place, and people around them thinking they are "not smart."

In media

Since the early days of the movie industry in the United States of America, when Black Hispanic actors were given roles, they would usually be cast as African Americans. For those with Spanish-speaking accents that betrayed an otherwise presumed African American, they may seldom have been given roles as Hispanics, and the mixed race Hispanic and Latino actors of African appearance were mostly given Hispanic roles.

Those who claim that Black Hispanics are not sought to play Hispanic roles in the United States allege this unfairly leads the masses of viewers to an ignorance to the existence of darker skinned Hispanics. Further, some Black Hispanics who identify themselves as black but of also mixed-race heritage once affirming their Hispanicity may be deprived of their status as Black people among African Americans, and categorized by society as non-Black in the American historical context.

Critics accuse U.S. Hispanic media, including Latin American media, of overlooking black Hispanic and Latino Americans and black Latin Americans in the telenovelas, mostly stereotyping them as impoverished people.

In January 2020, The Owl House began airing on the Disney Channel. The series would feature Luz Noceda, a Afro-Latino character whose parents are from the Dominican Republic, and was based on a friend of the show's creator, Dana Terrace, Luz Batista, who insisted that the character be Dominican like her.

In February 2021, LATV Networks, LLC premiered Blacktinidad, the first national TV series focusing specifically on the black Latin experience.

See also

 Afro-Cubans
 Afro–Puerto Ricans
 Afro-Dominicans of the Dominican Republic
 African Americans
 Afro–Latin Americans
 Afro-Brazilians
 Equatoguinean Americans
 List of Afro-Latinos
 List of Hispanic and Latino Americans
 White Hispanic and Latino Americans
 Asian Hispanic and Latino Americans
 Blaxican
 Garifuna - a people of mixed free African and indigenous American
 Oba Ifa Morote

References

Further reading
 The Afro-Latin@ Project - The Afro Latin@ Project aims to document, promote, coordinate and support the development of Afro-Latin@ studies and grass roots activities in the United States. This primary focus is informed and enriched by the historical and contemporary experience of African-descendant peoples in the Americas.
 RUSQ Afro-Latino Archives - An extensive list of books, films, memoirs, databases, and articles which provide more insight into the Afro-Latino experience, in and out of the United States.

External links
 PBS: A Cultural Identity (June 1997). Essayist Richard Rodriguez on the meaning of the "Hispanic" label.

 
 
Hispanic and Latino American
African–Hispanic and Latino American relations
Ethnic groups in the United States